Kufri can refer to:

 Kufri, India
 Kufri, Pakistan